The 104th Operational Maneuvers Regiment (104th RMO) is a special forces regiment of the Algerian Land Forces, and is also a parachute regiment.

History 
The 104th Operational Maneuver Regiment was created on November 2, 2005 by a presidential decree in order to support the former Algerian GIS and to participate in anti-terrorist operations in Algeria.

Moreover, the Algerian Land Forces wanted to have their own special forces regiment at the time, as they previously had only shock units, the Parachute Commando Regiments (RPC), which are not special forces but specialized units similar to the 75th Rangers regiment of the US army. Because of their training with the Special Forces "green berets", the 104th RMO has adopted an organization that is very much inspired by the latter as well as by NATO-type special forces units.

It is considered as the Algerian equivalent of the US Special Forces, the latter have also benefited from training, training and advanced courses abroad as in the United States, where they regularly visit the US green berets.

The headquarters of the 104th RMO is also located in the same city as the Commando Training and Initiation to Parachuting School (EFCIP) in Boghar.

Objectives 
The 104th RMO has several combat companies, each with its own specificities and specialties.

 A staff
 A LRRP company, specialized in reconnaissance and destruction in depth; it uses light armed patrol vehicles.
 An urban combat company. This company also includes bodyguards, marksman, counterterrorism and Hostage Rescue groups.
 A reconnaissance company, specialized in intelligence acquisition, search and neutralization at long range. It has within its ranks groups of snipers.
 A detection and assault company, specialized in special actions and combat in degraded environments, such as high mountains or dense forests. In addition, these operators are trained in mountaineering and crossing techniques (canyons, cliffs, bodies of water...).
 A support company, whose members are particularly oriented towards the 3rd dimension and the aquatic environment. In particular, it has groups of operational jumpers as well as amphibious assault groups.
 A training company, which provides selection, basic training and advanced training courses. The Specialized Training Group provides advanced and specialized training courses, such as sniper, hostage rescue, counterterrorism, close protection... The company also has facilities for "drill" buildings, helicopter models, and areas for reconstruction of houses, corridors, apartments... It also provides advanced training to other special or intervention units in Algeria, such as the RSI of the Republican Guard or the DSI of the Gendarmerie, but it can also train foreign units.

Missions 
The 104th RMO's primary missions are:
 Counterterrorism
 Special reconnaissance
 Hostage Rescue
 Anti guerrilla warfare
 Neutralization of forcenes, criminals or HVT 
 Special operations
 Search and destroy

Training 
The 104th RMO operators are trained in the Special Troops Superior School (ESTS) in Biskra for the skydiving and the special operations, and they're trained too in the commando and parachute training and initiation (EFCIP) in Boghar on commando techniques, survival, healing and second level special operations. For that the 104th RMO has a training plateform with several buildings and houses in order to the 104th RMO operators practice the counter terrorism and hostage rescue training. 

Moreover, they are foreign-trained including in United States, in Russia...

Material and equipments

Weapons 
Handguns

 Glock 17 in 9 × 19 mm Parabellum
 Caracal in 9 × 19 mm

Tactical lights, laser sight, silencer as well as RONI kits (with silencer and aimpoint sight) are often mounted on the Glock 17 which is the main weapon of the 104th RMO operators.

Submachine guns

Heckler & Koch MP7

Assault Rifle 
 AKM
 AKMS
 HK 416

Assault rifles are customized according to the operator but you can generally find on these weapons laser sights, tactical lights, silencers, anti-recoil sticks, Eotech, Acog, Aimpoint sights, etc.

Machine gun 
 PKM

Sniper rifle 
 Zatsava M93 Black Arrow
 Sako TRG 42
 SVD

Shotgun 
 Franchi SPAS 12
 Beretta RS202M2

Other 
 RPG-7
 RPG-29
 Milkor MGL

Individual equipment 
 Special troops uniform (lizard) or (woodland)
 Combat shoes : Combat boots
Ubas
 Helmet : Team wendy exfil ballistic helmet, fast ops core helmet
 bulletproof vest
 Plate carrier
 Tactical belt
 Knee pads and elbow pads
 Protective eyewear
 Balaclava
 Protective gloves
 Thigh Holster 
 Camelback
 Ghillie suit (for snipers)

Special 
 Bullet shield (light and heavy wheeled)
 Kevlar protective case
 Night vision apparatus
 SWORD T&D viewfinder
 Night and infrared sights
 Individual transmission apparatus
 Radios
Black Hornet Nano
Gladius 2.0 system

Resources

Vehicles 
 All-terrain tactical vehicles Toyota Land Cruiser, Mercedes-Benz G class, Nissan Patrol etc...

Special vehicle 
 Vehicle 4×4 Ford F-150 with Mobile Adjustable Ramp System (MARS)
 Humvee in different configurations: troop transport, patrol vehicle, armored transport vehicle.
 Nimr

Air assets 
 Mil Mi-171Sh of the Algerian Air Force
 Transports aircraft of the Algerian Air Force (C130, Casa C295, Il-76...)

Pictures

References

Military units and formations of Algeria
Special forces of Algeria